Everett Mills (January 20, 1845 – June 22, 1908) was an American Major League Baseball player from Newark, New Jersey.  He played in all five seasons of the National Association (–), and one season in the National League.  He played every one of his games at first base save for one game in center field.  In , he became player-manager for the final 17 games of the season while a member of the Baltimore Canaries.  The team finished in second place, and he would never manage again.

Everett died in his hometown of Newark at the age of 63, and was buried at Fairmount Cemetery.

References

External links

Major League Baseball first basemen
Baseball player-managers
New Jersey Irvingtons players
New York Mutuals (NABBP) players
Washington Olympics players
Baltimore Canaries players
Baltimore Canaries managers
Hartford Dark Blues players
Sportspeople from Newark, New Jersey
Baseball players from Newark, New Jersey
Burials at Fairmount Cemetery (Newark, New Jersey)
19th-century baseball players
1845 births
1908 deaths
Milwaukee (minor league baseball) players
New Bedford (minor league baseball) players
New Haven (minor league baseball) players
Hartford (minor league baseball) players